Tarsoctenus is a genus of Neotropical butterflies in the family Hesperiidae, in which it is placed in tribe Entheini.

Species
Tarsoctenus corytus (Cramer, [1777]) Suriname to Colombia, Brazil (Amazonas)
T. corytus corytus Suriname
T. corytus corba Evans, 1952 Peru
T. corytus gaudialis (Hewitson, 1876) Panama
Tarsoctenus papias  (Hewitson, 1857)  Brazil (Amazonas)
Tarsoctenus praecia  (Hewitson, 1857) Brazil 
T. praecia praecia  Brazil (Pará)
T. praecia plutia (Hewitson, 1857) Brazil (Amazonas)
T. praecia rufibasis  Boullet, 1910 French Guiana
T. praecia luna Evans, 1952 Bolivia

References

Natural History Museum Lepidoptera genus database

External links
images representing Tarsoctenus at Consortium for the Barcode of Life

Eudaminae
Hesperiidae of South America
Lepidoptera of Brazil
Lepidoptera of French Guiana
Butterflies of Central America
Fauna of the Amazon
Hesperiidae genera
Taxa named by Edward Yerbury Watson